Tooraj Khamenehzadeh (born 1977 in Qazvin, Iran) is an Iranian artist and curator, based in Tehran and New York.

Biography 
He received a Bachelor of Science degree in computer engineering from Qazvin Azad University in Iran. He enrolled in the Master of Fine Arts degree in Photo, Video and Related Media program at the School of Visual Arts (SVA) in New York City, New York.

Khamenehzadeh's art works has presented in various international festivals, art exhibitions, and biennials such as Polyforme Festival, Chongqing Photo and Video Biennale and is published in different books and magazines like African Textile Today (2012) and PIX magazine.

He is co-founder and a board member of the Rybon Art Center, an independent art institute in Tehran, a board member of Res Artis, as well as program manager of Kooshk Residency in Tehran.

References

Iranian photographers
1977 births
Living people
People from Qazvin
American people of Iranian descent